The 2019 Campeonato Carioca Série B1 was the 39th edition of the second division of football in Rio de Janeiro. The contest is organized by FERJ. Since 2017, the Campeonato Carioca Série B has been called the Série B1. Friburguense were champions, defeating America 2-1 in the second match of the final after the first match ended 1-1. Friburguense and America were promoted to the 2020 Campeonato Carioca. America returned to the top division in 2020 after being relegated from the 2019 Campeonato Carioca.

Participating teams

Championship round

Taça Santos Dumont
Group A

Group B

 Knockout stage

Taça Corcovado
Group A

Group B

 Knockout stage

Overall table

Final stage

References

Campeonato Carioca seasons
2019 in Brazilian football leagues